CCR4-NOT transcription complex subunit 6 is a protein that in humans is encoded by the CNOT6 gene.

The protein encoded by this gene is a subunit of the CCR4-Not transcriptional regulation and deadenylase complex. The encoded protein has a 3'-5' exonuclease activity and prefers polyadenylated substates.

References

External links

Further reading